Sulfiram (INN) or monosulfiram, trade name Tetmosol, is an ectoparasiticide used in the treatment and prevention of scabies. It is usually sold as a solution or medicated soap, sometimes in combination with benzyl benzoate.

Sulfiram is now rarely used, but, is still available in Brazil, India, and South Africa (as monotherapy).

Adverse effects
Dizziness, headache, fatigue and erythematous rash may occur. A single case of toxic epidermal necrolysis was reported in 1968.

Sulfiram is structurally related to disulfiram (Antabuse), and readily converts to disulfiram when exposed to light. Like disulfiram, it can produce an unpleasant reaction when consumed with alcohol.

References

External links
Tetmosol* soap – South African Electronic Package Insert

Acetaldehyde dehydrogenase inhibitors
Dithiocarbamates